New Mexico is a state in the Southwestern United States. It is one of the Mountain States of the southern Rocky Mountains, sharing the Four Corners region of the western U.S. with Utah, Colorado, and Arizona, and bordering Texas to the east and southeast, Oklahoma to the northeast, and the Mexican states of Chihuahua and Sonora to the south. New Mexico's largest city is Albuquerque, and its state capital is Santa Fe, which is the oldest state capital in the U.S., having been founded in 1610 as the government seat of Nuevo México in New Spain.

New Mexico is the fifth-largest of the fifty states, but with just over 2.1 million residents, ranks 36th in population and 46th in population density. Its climate and geography are highly varied, ranging from forested mountains to sparse deserts; the northern and eastern regions exhibit a colder alpine climate, while the west and south are warmer and more arid. The Rio Grande and its fertile valley runs from north-to-south, creating a riparian climate through the center of the state that supports a bosque habitat and distinct Albuquerque Basin climate. One–third of New Mexico's land is federally owned, and the state hosts many protected wilderness areas and national monuments, including three UNESCO World Heritage Sites, the most of any state.

New Mexico's economy is highly diversified, including cattle ranching, agriculture, lumber, scientific and technological research, tourism, and the arts, especially textiles and visual arts. The state has significant sectors in mining, oil and gas, aerospace, media, and film. Its total gross domestic product (GDP) in 2020 was $95.73 billion, with a GDP per capita of roughly $46,300. State tax policy is characterized by low to moderate taxation of resident personal income by national standards, with tax credits, exemptions, and special considerations for military personnel and favorable industries. Due to its large area and economic climate, New Mexico has a significant U.S. military presence, including White Sands Missile Range, and strategically valuable federal research centers, such as Sandia and Los Alamos National Laboratories. The state hosted several key facilities of the Manhattan Project, which developed the world's first atomic bomb, and was the site of the first nuclear test, Trinity.

In prehistoric times, New Mexico was home to Ancestral Puebloans, Mogollon, as well as ancestors of the Comanche and Ute people. Navajos and Apaches entered the state towards the end of the 15th century. Spanish explorers and settlers arrived in the 16th century from present-day Mexico, naming the territory Nuevo México after the Aztec legends about the Pueblos of Yancuic Mexihco, a new Mexico, which evolved into the stories of the Seven Cities of Gold. Isolated by its rugged terrain and the relative dominance of its indigenous people, New Mexico was a peripheral part of the viceroyalty of New Spain. Following Mexican independence in 1821, it became an autonomous region of Mexico, albeit increasingly threatened by the centralizing policies of the Mexican government, culminating in the Revolt of 1837; at the same time, the region became more economically dependent on the United States. At the conclusion of the Mexican–American War in 1848, the U.S. annexed New Mexico as part of the larger New Mexico Territory. It played a central role in U.S. westward expansion and was admitted to the Union as the 47th state on January 6, 1912.

New Mexico's history has contributed to its unique demographic and cultural character. One of only six majority-minority states, it has the nation's highest percentage of Hispanic and Latino Americans and the second-highest percentage of Native Americans after Alaska. New Mexico is home to part of the Navajo Nation, 19 federally recognized Pueblo communities, and three different federally recognized Apache tribes. Its large Hispanic population includes Hispanos, who descend from Oasisamerican groups and settlers of Nuevo México in New Spain, as well as later groups of Mexican Americans since the 19th century. The New Mexican flag, which is among the most recognizable in the U.S., reflects the state's eclectic origins, bearing the scarlet and gold coloration of the Spanish flag along with the ancient sun symbol of the Zia, a Puebloan tribe. The confluence of indigenous, Hispanic (Spanish and Mexican), and American influences is also evident in New Mexico's unique cuisine, music genre, and architectural styles.

Etymology

New Mexico received its name long before the present-day nation of Mexico won independence from Spain and adopted that name in 1821. The name "Mexico" derives from Nahuatl and originally referred to the heartland of the Mexica, the rulers of the Aztec Empire, in the Valley of Mexico. The Classical Nahuatl term Yancuic Mexihco, a New Mexico, was used to describe a mystical empire that rivaled the scale of their own Aztec Empire. These myths had a basis in the trade network of the Pueblos. These stories eventually evolved into the folklore of the Seven Cities of Gold.

Following their conquest of the Aztecs in the early 16th century, the Spanish began exploring what is now the Southwestern United States calling it Nuevo México, a Spanish language translation of the prior Nahuatl term Yancuic Mexihco. In 1581, the Chamuscado and Rodríguez Expedition named the region north of the Rio Grande San Felipe del Nuevo México. The Spaniards had hoped to find wealthy indigenous cultures similar to the Mexica. The indigenous cultures of New Mexico, however, proved to be unrelated to the Mexica and lacking in riches, but the name persisted.

Before statehood in 1912, the name "New Mexico" loosely applied to various configurations of territories in the same general area, which evolved throughout the Spanish, Mexican, and U.S. periods, but typically encompassed most of present-day New Mexico along with sections of neighboring states.

History

Prehistory

The first known inhabitants of New Mexico were members of the Clovis culture of Paleo-Indians. Footprints discovered in 2017 suggest that humans may have been present in the region as long ago as 21,000–23,000 BC. Later inhabitants include the Mogollon and Ancestral Pueblo cultures, which are characterized by sophisticated pottery work and urban development; pueblos or their remnants, like those at Acoma, Taos, and Chaco Culture National Historical Park, indicate the scale of Ancestral Puebloan dwellings within the area. These cultures form part of the broader Oasisamerica region of pre-Columbian North America.

The extensive scale of Ancestral Puebloan trade networks led to legends throughout Mesoamerica and the Aztec Empire (Mexico) of an unseen northern empire that rivaled their own, which they called Yancuic Mexico, literally translated as "a new Mexico".

Nuevo México

New Spain era 

The Aztec legends of a prosperous empire to their north became the primary basis for the mythical Seven Cities of Gold, which spurred exploration by Spanish conquistadors following their conquest of the Aztecs; prominent explorers included Álvar Núñez Cabeza de Vaca, Andrés Dorantes de Carranza, Alonso del Castillo Maldonado, Estevanico, and Marcos de Niza.

Francisco Vásquez de Coronado assembled an enormous expedition at Compostela in 1540–1542 in search of these fabled golden cities. Francisco de Ibarra was one of the first Spaniards to use the term New Mexico, after reported his findings in 1563 as confirmation of "a New Mexico". Juan de Oñate officially established the name when he was appointed the first governor of the new Province of New Mexico in 1598. The same year, he founded the San Juan de los Caballeros capital at San Gabriel de Yungue-Ouinge, the first permanent European settlement in New Mexico, on the Rio Grande near Ohkay Owingeh Pueblo. But following the heavy-handed treatment of the natives, Oñate was exiled from New Mexico.

The settlement of La Villa Real de la Santa Fe de San Francisco de Asís was established by Pedro de Peralta as a more permanent capital at the foot of the Sangre de Cristo Mountains in 1610. Towards the end of the 17th century, the Pueblo Revolt drove out the Spanish and occupied these early cities for over a decade. After the death of Pueblo leader Popé, Diego de Vargas restored the area to Spanish rule, with Puebloans offered better cultural and religious liberties. Returning settlers founded La Villa de Alburquerque in 1706 at Old Town Albuquerque as a trading center for existing surrounding communities such as Barelas, Isleta, Los Ranchos, and Sandia; it was named for the viceroy of New Spain, Francisco Fernández de la Cueva, 10th Duke of Alburquerque. Governor Francisco Cuervo y Valdés established the villa in Tiguex to provide free trade access and facilitate cultural exchange in the region.

Beyond forging better relations with the Pueblos, some governors like Tomás Vélez Cachupín became well known for their forward-thinking approach to indigenous rights; the comparatively large reservations in New Mexico and Arizona are partly a legacy of Spanish treaties recognizing indigenous land claims in Nuevo México. Nevertheless, relations between the various indigenous groups and Spanish settlers remained nebulous and complex, varying from trade and commerce to cultural assimilation and intermarriage or total warfare. The region's harsh environment and remoteness fostered a greater degree of self-reliance, as well as pragmatic cooperation, among and between natives and colonists. Many indigenous communities enjoyed a large measure of autonomy well into the late 19th century.

To encourage settlement in its vulnerable periphery, Spain awarded land grands to European settlers in Nuevo México; due to the scarcity of water throughout the region, the vast majority of colonists resided in the central valley of the Rio Grande and its tributaries. Most communities were walled enclaves consisting of adobe houses that opened onto a plaza, from which four streets ran outward to small, private agricultural plots and orchards, which were watered by acequias (community irrigation canals). Just beyond the walls was the ejido, communal land for grazing, firewood, or recreation. By 1800, the population of New Mexico had reached 25,000 (not including indigenous inhabitants), far exceeding the territories of California and Texas.

Mexico era 

As part of New Spain, the province of New Mexico passed to the First Mexican Empire in 1821 following the Mexican War of Independence. Upon its secession from Mexico in 1836, the Republic of Texas claimed the portion east of the Rio Grande, based on the erroneous assumption that the older Hispanic settlements of the upper Rio Grande were the same as the newly established Mexican settlements of Texas. The Texan Santa Fe Expedition was launched to seize the contested territory but failed with the capture and imprisonment of the entire army by the Hispanic New Mexico militia.

During the turn of the 19th century, the extreme northeastern part of New Mexico, north of the Canadian River and east of the spine of the Sangre de Cristo Mountains, was still claimed by France, which sold it in 1803 as part of the Louisiana Purchase. When the Louisiana Territory was admitted as a state in 1812, the U.S. reclassified the remaining land as part of the Missouri Territory. The region (along with territory comprising present-day southeastern Colorado, the Texas and Oklahoma Panhandles, and southwestern Kansas) was ceded to Spain under the Adams-Onis Treaty in 1819.

When the First Mexican Republic began to transition into the Centralist Republic of Mexico, they began to centralize power ignoring the sovereignty of Santa Fe and disregarding Pueblo land rights. This led to the Chimayó Rebellion in 1837, led by genízaro José Gonzales. The death of then governor Albino Pérez during the revolt, was met with further hostility. Though José Gonzales was executed due to his involvement in the governor's death, subsequent governors Manuel Armijo and Juan Bautista Vigil y Alarid agreed with some of the underlying sentiment. This led to New Mexico becoming financially and politically tied to the U.S., and preferring trade along the Santa Fe Trail.

Territorial phase

Following the victory of the United States in the Mexican–American War (1846–48), the Treaty of Guadalupe Hidalgo resulted in Mexico ceding its northern holdings to the U.S., including the territories of Mexican California, Texas, and New Mexico. The Americans were initially heavy-handed in their treatment of former Mexican citizens, triggering the Taos Revolt in 1847 by Hispanos and their Pueblo allies; the insurrection led to the death of territorial governor Charles Bent and the collapse of the civilian government established by Stephen W. Kearny. In response, the U.S. government appointed local Donaciano Vigil as governor to better represent New Mexico, and also vowed to accept the land rights of Nuevomexicans and grant them citizenship. Years later, in 1864, President Abraham Lincoln symbolized the recognition of Native land rights with the Lincoln Canes, sceptres of office gifted to each of the Pueblos, a tradition dating back to Spanish and Mexican eras.

After Texas was admitted as a state in 1845, it continued to claim a northeastern portion of New Mexico east of the Rio Grande. Under the Compromise of 1850, it was forced by the U.S. government to drop these claims in exchange for $10million in federal funds. Pursuant to the compromise, Congress established the separate New Mexico Territory in September of that year; it included most of present-day Arizona and New Mexico, along with the Las Vegas Valley and what would later become Clark County in Nevada.

In 1853, the U.S. acquired the mostly desert southwestern bootheel of the state, along with Arizona's land south of the Gila River, in the Gadsden Purchase, which was needed for the right-of-way to encourage construction of a transcontinental railroad.

U.S. Civil War, Indian Wars, and American frontier 

When the U.S. Civil War broke out in 1861, both Confederate and Union governments claimed ownership and territorial rights over New Mexico Territory. The Confederacy claimed the southern tract as its own Arizona Territory, and as part of the Trans-Mississippi Theater of the war, waged the ambitious New Mexico Campaign to control the American Southwest and open up access to Union California. Confederate power in the New Mexico Territory was effectively broken after the Battle of Glorieta Pass in 1862. However, the Confederate territorial government continued to operate out of Texas, and Confederate troops marched under the Arizona flag until the end of the war. More than 8,000 soldiers from New Mexico Territory served in the Union Army.

The end of the war saw rapid economic development and settlement in New Mexico, which attracted homesteaders, ranchers, cowboys, businessmen, and outlaws; many of the folklore characters of the Western genre had their origins in New Mexico, most notably businesswoman Maria Gertrudis Barceló, outlaw Billy the Kid, as well as lawmen Pat Garrett and Elfego Baca. The influx of "Anglo Americans" from the eastern U.S. (which include African Americans and recent European immigrants) reshaped the state's economy, culture, and politics. Into the late 19th century, the majority of New Mexicans remained ethnic mestizos of mixed Spanish and Native American ancestry (primarily Pueblo, Navajo, Apache, Genízaro, and Comanche), many of whom had roots going back to Spanish settlement in the 16th century; this distinctly New Mexican ethnic group became referred to as Hispanos and developed a more pronounced identity vis-a-vis the newer Anglo arrivals. Politically, they still controlled most town and county offices through local elections, and wealthy ranching families commanded considerable influence, preferring business, legislative, and judicial relations with fellow indigenous New Mexican groups. By contrast, Anglo Americans, who were "outnumbered, but well-organized and growing" tended to have more ties to the territorial government, whose officials were appointed by the U.S. federal government; subsequently, newer residents of New Mexico generally favored maintaining territorial status, which they saw as a check on Native and Hispano influence.

Another consequence of the civil war was intensifying conflict with indigenous peoples, which was part of the broader Indian Wars along the frontier. The withdrawal of troops and material for the war effort had prompted raids by hostile tribes, and the federal government moved to subdue the many native communities that had been effectively autonomous throughout the colonial period. Following the elimination of the Confederate threat, Brigadier General James Carleton, who had assumed command of the Military Department of New Mexico in 1862, led what he described as a "merciless war against all hostile tribes" that aimed to "force them to their knees, and then confine them to reservations where they could be Christianized and instructed in agriculture." With famed frontiersman Kit Carson placed in charge of troops in the field, powerful indigenous groups such as the Navajo, Mescalero Apache, Kiowa, and Comanche were brutally pacified through a scorched earth policy, and thereafter forced into barren and remote reservations. Sporadic conflicts continued into the late 1880s, most notably the guerilla campaigns led by Apache chiefs Victorio and his son-in-law Nana.

The political and cultural clashes between these competing groups would sometimes culminate in mob violence, including lynchings of Native, Hispanic, and Mexican peoples, as was attempted at the Frisco shootout of 1884. Nevertheless, prominent figures from across these communities, as well as from both the Democratic and Republican parties of New Mexico, attempted to fight this prejudice and forge a more cohesive, multiethnic New Mexican identity; they include lawmen Garrett and Baca and governors George Curry Herber Hagerman, and Miguel Antonio Otero. Some territorial governors like Lew Wallace had served in both the Mexican and American militaries.

Statehood

The United States Congress admitted New Mexico as the 47th state on January 6, 1912. It had been eligible for statehood 60 years earlier but was delayed due to the perception of the population being majority "alien" Mexican American.

Indo-Hispano families had long been established since the Spanish and Mexican era, but most American settlers in the state had an uneasy relationship with the large Native American tribes. Most indigenous New Mexicans lived on reservations and near old placitas and villas. In 1924, Congress passed a law granting all Native Americans U.S. citizenship and the right to vote in federal and state elections. But American arrivals into New Mexico established Jim Crow laws against Hispanics and those who did not pay taxes, targeting indigenous affiliated individuals. Because the Hispanos often had interpersonal relationships with indigenous groups, they were often subject to segregation, social inequality, and employment discrimination.

During the fight for women's suffrage in the United States, New Mexico's Hispano and Mexican women at the forefront included Trinidad Cabeza de Baca, Dolores "Lola" Armijo, Mrs. James Chavez, Aurora Lucero, Anita "Mrs. Secundino" Romero, Arabella "Mrs. Cleofas" Romero and her daughter, Marie.

A major oil discovery in 1928 brought wealth to the state, especially Lea County and the town of Hobbs. The town was named after James Hobbs, a homesteader there in 1907. The Midwest State No.1 well, begun in late 1927 with a standard cable-tool drilling rig, revealed the first signs of oil from the Hobbs field on June 13, 1928. Drilled to 4,330 feet and completed a few months later, the well produced 700 barrels of oil per day on state land. The Midwest Refining Company's Hobbs well produced oil until 2002. The New Mexico Bureau of Mines and Mineral Resources called it "the most important single discovery of oil in New Mexico's history".

During World War II, the first atomic bombs were designed and manufactured at Los Alamos, a site developed by the federal government specifically to support a high-intensity scientific effort to rapidly complete research and testing of this weapon. The first bomb was tested at Trinity site in the desert between Socorro and Alamogordo on what is now White Sands Missile Range. This high technology focus has remained a top priority of the state, so much so that the state became a center for unidentified flying objects, especially following the 1947 Roswell incident in Roswell.

Native Americans from New Mexico fought for the United States in both the First and Second World Wars. Veterans were disappointed to return and find their civil rights limited by state discrimination. In Arizona and New Mexico, veterans challenged state laws or practices prohibiting them from voting. In 1948, after veteran Miguel Trujillo, Sr. of Isleta Pueblo was told by the county registrar that he could not register to vote, he filed suit against the county in federal district court. A three-judge panel overturned as unconstitutional New Mexico's provisions that Indians who did not pay taxes (and could not document if they had paid taxes) could not vote. Judge Phillips wrote:

New Mexico has received large amounts of federal government spending on major military and research institutions in the state. It is home to three Air Force bases, the White Sands Missile Range, and the federal research laboratories Los Alamos National Laboratory and Sandia National Laboratories. The state's population grew rapidly after World War II, nearly doubling between 1940 and 1960; by 2000, residents numbered over 1.8 million from roughly 532,000 in 1940. While the high military presence brought considerable investment, it has also been the center of controversy; on May 22, 1957, a B-36 accidentally dropped a nuclear bomb 4.5 miles from the control tower while landing at Kirtland Air Force Base in Albuquerque; only its conventional "trigger" detonated.

In addition to federal personnel and agencies, many residents and businesses moved to the state, particularly from the northeast, often drawn by its warm climate and low taxes. The pattern continues into the 21st century, with New Mexico adding over 400,000 residents between 2000 and 2020.

In the early to mid-20th century, the art presence in Santa Fe grew, and it became known as one of the world's great art centers. The presence of artists such as Georgia O'Keeffe attracted many others, including those along Canyon Road. In the late 20th century, Native Americans were authorized by federal law to establish gaming casinos on their reservations under certain conditions, in states which had authorized such gaming. Such facilities have helped tribes close to population centers generate revenues for reinvestment in the economic development and welfare of their peoples. The Albuquerque metropolitan area is home to several casinos because of this.

In the 21st century, employment growth areas in New Mexico include electronic circuitry, scientific research, information technology, New Mexican casinos, art of the American Southwest, food, film, and media in Albuquerque. The state was the founding location of Micro Instrumentation and Telemetry Systems, which led to the founding of Microsoft in Albuquerque. Intel maintains their F11X in Rio Rancho, the company HP Inc. maintains an IT center there. New Mexico's culinary scene became recognized and is now a source of revenue for the state. Albuquerque Studios has become a filming hub for Netflix, and it was brought international media production companies to the state like NBCUniversal.

Geography

On the southern border, Texas makes up the eastern two-thirds, while the Mexican states of Chihuahua and Sonora make up the western third, with Chihuahua making up about 90% of that. The western border with Arizona runs along the 109° 03'W longitude. The southwestern corner of the state is known as the Bootheel. The 37°N parallel forms the northern boundary with Colorado. The states of New Mexico, Colorado, Arizona, and Utah come together at the Four Corners in New Mexico's northwestern corner.

Despite its popular depiction as mostly arid desert, New Mexico has one of the most diverse landscapes of any U.S. state, ranging from wide, auburn-colored deserts and verdant grasslands, to broken mesas and high, snow-capped peaks. Close to a third of the state is covered in timberland, with heavily forested mountain wildernesses dominating the north. The Sangre de Cristo Mountains, the southernmost part of the Rocky Mountains, run roughly north–south along the east side of the Rio Grande, in the rugged, pastoral north. The Great Plains extend into the eastern third of the state, most notably the Llano Estacado ("Staked Plain"), whose westernmost boundary is marked by the Mescalero Ridge escarpment. The northwestern quadrant of New Mexico is dominated by the Colorado Plateau, characterized by unique volcanic formations, dry grasslands and shrublands, open pinyon-juniper woodland, and mountain forests. The Chihuahuan Desert, which is the largest in North America, extends through the south.

In addition to the Rio Grande, which is tied for the fourth-longest river in the U.S., New Mexico has four other major river systems: the Pecos, Canadian, San Juan, and Gila. Nearly bisecting New Mexico from north to south, the Rio Grande has played an influential role in the region's history; its fertile floodplain has supported human habitation since prehistoric times, and European settlers initially lived exclusively in its valleys and along its tributaries. The Pecos, which flows roughly parallel to the Rio Grande at its east, was a popular route for explorers, as was the Canadian River, which rises in the mountainous north and flows east across the arid plains. The San Juan and Gila lie west of the Continental Divide, in the northwest and southwest, respectively. With the exception of the Gila, all major rivers are dammed in New Mexico and provide a major water source for irrigation and flood control.

Aside from its rivers, New Mexico has few sizeable natural bodies of water; there are several artificial lakes and reservoirs, the largest being Elephant Butte Reservoir, which was created by the damming of the Rio Grande. At its height in the early 20th century, the reservoir was the largest man-made lake in the world.

Conservation experts, hunters, and outdoors enthusiasts have expressed an appreciation for New Mexico's natural environment and even-handed New Mexico Department of Game and Fish. Author N. Scott Momaday discussed the indigenous, Hispanic, and American frontier setting of New Mexico and its shared relationship to the land, which was covered in a documentary he narrated titled Remembered Earth about New Mexico's high desert. Large game hunters such as Robert L. Runnels, fishing experts Van Beacham and Ti Piper, and duck hunters like Si Robertson of Duck Commander, have acknowledged the wildlife hunting and fishing environment in New Mexico.

Climate
New Mexico has long been known for its dry, temperate climate. Overall the state is semi-arid to arid, with areas of continental and alpine climates at higher elevations. New Mexico's statewide average precipitation is  a year, with average monthly amounts peaking in the summer, particularly in the more rugged north-central area around Albuquerque and in the south. Generally, the eastern third of the state receives the most rainfall, while the western third receives the least.

In the colder months of November to March, many cities in New Mexico can have nighttime temperature lows in the teens above zero, or lower.
New Mexico's stable climate and sparse population provides for clearer skies and less light pollution, making it a popular site for several major astronomical observatories, including the Apache Point Observatory, the Very Large Array, and the Magdalena Ridge Observatory, among others.

Flora and fauna

Owing to its varied topography, New Mexico has six distinct vegetation zones that provide diverse sets of habitats for many plants and animals. The Upper Sonoran Zone is by far the most prominent, constituting about three-fourths of the state; it includes most of the plains, foothills, and valleys above 4,500 feet, and is defined by prairie grasses, low piñon pines, and juniper shrubs. The Llano Estacado in the east features shortgrass prairie with blue grama, which sustain bison. The Chihuahuan Desert in the south is characterized by shrubby creosote. The Colorado Plateau in the northwest corner of New Mexico is high desert with cold winters, featuring sagebrush, shadescale, greasewood, and other plants adapted to the saline and seleniferous soil.

The mountainous north hosts a wide array of vegetation types corresponding to elevation gradients, such as piñon-juniper woodlands near the base, through evergreen conifers, spruce-fir and aspen forests in the transitionary zone, and Krummholz, and alpine tundra at the very top. The Apachian zone tucked into the southwestern bootheel of the state has high-calcium soil, oak woodlands, Arizona cypress, and other plants that are not found in other parts of the state. The southern sections of the Rio Grande and Pecos valleys have  of New Mexico's best grazing land and irrigated farmland.

New Mexico's varied climate and vegetation zones consequently support diverse wildlife. Black bears, bighorn sheep, bobcats, cougars, deer, and elk live in habitats above 7,000 feet, while coyotes, jackrabbits, kangaroo rats, javelina, porcupines, pronghorn antelope, western diamondbacks, and wild turkeys live in less mountainous and elevated regions. The iconic roadrunner, which is the state bird, is abundant in the southeast. Endangered species include the Mexican gray wolf, which is being gradually reintroduced in the world, and Rio Grande silvery minnow. Over 500 species of birds live or migrate through New Mexico, third only to California and Mexico.

Conservation 
New Mexico and 12 other western states together account for 93% of all federally owned land in the U.S. Roughly one–third of the state, or 24.7 million of 77.8 million acres, is held by the U.S. government, the tenth-highest percentage in the country. More than half this land is under the Bureau of Land Management, while another third is managed by the U.S. Forest Service.

New Mexico was central to the early–20th century conservation movement, with Gila Wilderness being designated the world's first wilderness area in 1924. The state also hosts nine of the country's 84 national monuments, the most of any state after Arizona; these include the second oldest monument, El Morro, which was created in 1906, and the Gila Cliff Dwellings, proclaimed in 1907.

Areas managed by the National Park Service include:

National Wildlife Refuges in New Mexico managed by the U.S. Fish and Wildlife Service include:
 Bitter Lake National Wildlife Refuge
 Bosque del Apache National Wildlife Refuge
 Grulla National Wildlife Refuge
 Las Vegas National Wildlife Refuge
 Maxwell National Wildlife Refuge
 San Andres National Wildlife Refuge
 Sevilleta National Wildlife Refuge
 Valle de Oro National Wildlife Refuge

Independent wildlife refuges in New Mexico include:
 Whitfield Wildlife Conservation Area in Valencia County
 Albuquerque Open Space, see Open Space Visitor Center

Areas managed by the New Mexico State Parks Division:

Environmental issues

In January 2016, New Mexico sued the United States Environmental Protection Agency over negligence after the 2015 Gold King Mine waste water spill. The spill had caused heavy metals such as cadmium and lead and toxins such as arsenic to flow into the Animas River, polluting water basins of several states. The state has since implemented or considered stricter regulations and harsher penalties for spills associated with resource extraction.

New Mexico is a major producer of greenhouse gases. A study by Colorado State University showed that the state's oil and gas industry generated 60 million metric tons of greenhouse gases in 2018, over four times greater than previously estimated. The fossil fuels sector accounted for over half the state's overall emissions, which totaled 113.6 million metric tons, about 1.8% of the country's total and more than twice the national average per capita. The New Mexico government has responded with efforts to regulate industrial emissions, promote renewable energy, and incentivize the use of electric vehicles.

Settlements 

The state is divided into 33 counties and 106 municipalities, which include cities, towns, villages, and a consolidated city-county, Los Alamos. Only two cities have at least 100,000 residents: Albuquerque and Las Cruces, whose respective metropolitan areas together account for the majority of New Mexico's population.

Residents are concentrated in the north-central region of New Mexico, anchored by the state's largest city, Albuquerque. Centered in Bernalillo County, the Albuquerque metropolitan area includes New Mexico's third-largest city, Rio Rancho, and has a population of over 918,000, accounting for one-third of all New Mexicans. It is adjacent to Santa Fe, the capital and fourth-largest city. Altogether, the Albuquerque–Santa Fe–Las Vegas combined statistical area includes more than 1.17 million people, or nearly 60% of the state population.

New Mexico's other major center of population is in south-central area around Las Cruces, its second-largest city and the largest city in the southern region of the state. The Las Cruces metropolitan area includes roughly 214,000 residents, but with neighboring El Paso, Texas forms a combined statistical area numbering over 1 million.

New Mexico hosts 23 federally recognized tribal reservations, including part of the Navajo Nation, the largest and most populous tribe; of these, 11 hold off-reservation trust lands elsewhere in the state. The vast majority of federally recognized tribes are concentrated in the northwest, followed by the north-central region.

Like several other southwestern states, New Mexico hosts numerous colonias, unincorporated, low-income slums characterized by abject poverty, the absence of basic services (such as water and sewage), and scarce housing and infrastructure. The University of New Mexico estimates there are 118 colonias in the state, though the U.S. Department of Housing and Urban Development identifies roughly 150.  The majority are located along the Mexico-U.S. border.

Demographics

Population

The 2020 census recorded a population of 2,117,522, an increase of 2.8% from 2,059,179 in the 2010 census. This was the lowest rate of growth in the western U.S. after Wyoming, and among the slowest nationwide. By comparison, between 2000 and 2010, New Mexico's population increased by 11.7% from 1,819,046among the fastest growth rates in the country. A report commissioned in 2021 by the New Mexico Legislature attributed the state's slow growth to a negative net migration rate, particularly among those 18 or younger, and to a 19% decline in the birth rate. However, growth among Hispanics and Native Americans remained healthy.

Estimates from the U.S. Census Bureau found a slight decrease in population, with 3,333 fewer people from July 2021 to July 2022. This was attributed to deaths exceeding births by roughly 5,000, with net migration mitigating the loss by 1,389.

More than half of New Mexicans (51.4%) were born in the state; 37.9% were born in another state; 1.1% were born in either Puerto Rico, an island territory, or abroad to at least one American parent; and 9.4% were foreign born (compared to a national average of roughly 12%). Almost a quarter of the population (22.7%) was under the age of 18, and the state's median age of 38.4 is slightly above the national average of 38.2. New Mexico's somewhat older population is partly reflective of its popularity among retirees: It ranked as the most popular retirement destination in 2018, with an estimated 42% of new residents being retired.

Hispanics and Latinos constitute nearly half of all residents (49.3%), giving New Mexico the highest proportion of Hispanic ancestry among the fifty states. This broad classification includes descendants of Spanish colonists who settled between the 16th and 18th centuries as well as recent immigrants from Latin America (particularly Mexico and Central America).

From 2000 to 2010, the number of persons in poverty increased to 400,779, or approximately one-fifth of the population. The latest 2020 census recorded a slightly reduced poverty rate of 18.2%, albeit the third highest among U.S. states, compared to a national average of 10.5%. Poverty disproportionately affects minorities, with about one-third of African Americans and Native Americans living in poverty, compared with less than a fifth of whites and roughly a tenth of Asians; likewise, New Mexico ranks 49th among states for education equality by race and 32nd for its racial gap in income.

New Mexico's population is among the most difficult to count, according to the Center for Urban Research at the City University of New York. Challenges include the state's size, sparse population, and numerous isolated communities. Likewise, the Census Bureau estimated that roughly 43% of the state's population (about 900,000 people) live in such "hard-to-count" areas. In response, the New Mexico government invested heavily in public outreach to increase census participation, resulting in a final tally that exceeded earlier estimates and outperformed several neighboring states.

According to HUD's 2022 Annual Homeless Assessment Report, there were an estimated 2,560 homeless people in New Mexico.

Birth data
The majority of live births in New Mexico are to Hispanic whites, with Hispanics of any race consistently accounting for well over half of all live births since 2013.

Race and ethnicity
New Mexico is one of six "majority-minority" states where non-Hispanic whites constitute less than half the population. As early as 1940, roughly half the population was estimated to be nonwhite. Prior to becoming a state in 1912, New Mexico was among the few U.S. territories that was predominately nonwhite, which contributed to its delayed admission into the Union.

The largest ethnic group is Hispanic and Latino Americans, according to the 2020 census they account for 47.7% of nearly half of the state's population. The majority of which are Hispanos of New Mexico and Mexican Americans.

New Mexico has the fourth largest Native American community in the U.S., at over 200,000. Comprising roughly one-tenth of all residents, this is the second largest population by percentage after Alaska. New Mexico is also the only state besides Alaska where indigenous people have maintained a stable proportion of the population for over a century: In 1890, Native Americans made up 9.4% of New Mexico's population, almost the same percentage as in 2020. By contrast, during that same period, neighboring Arizona went from one-third indigenous to less than 5%. New Mexico's population consists of many mestizo Indo-Hispano groups, including those of  Oasisamerican Hispanos and Mesoamerican Indigenous Mexican American descent.

According to the 2000 United States census,the most commonly claimed ancestry groups in New Mexico were:
 Mexican (16.3%)
 Native American (10.3%)
 German (9.8%)
 Spanish (9.3%)
 English (7.2%)
Census data from 2020 found that 19.9% of the population identifies as multiracial/mixed-race, a population larger than the Native American, Black, Asian and NHPI population groups.

Languages

New Mexico ranks third after California and Texas in the number of multilingual residents. According to the 2010 U.S. census, 28.5% of the population age5 and older speak Spanish at home, while 3.5% speak Navajo. Some speakers of New Mexican Spanish are descendants of pre-18th century Spanish settlers. Contrary to popular belief, New Mexican Spanish is not an archaic form of 17th-century Castilian Spanish; though some archaic elements exist, linguistic research has determined that the dialect "is neither more Iberian nor more archaic" than other varieties spoken in the Americas. Nevertheless, centuries of isolation during the colonial period insulated the New Mexican dialect from "standard" Spanish, leading to the preservation of older vocabulary as well as its own innovations.

Besides Navajo, which is also spoken in Arizona, several other Native American languages are spoken by smaller groups in New Mexico, most of which are endemic to the state. Native New Mexican languages include Mescalero Apache, Jicarilla Apache, Tewa, Southern Tiwa, Northern Tiwa, Towa, Keres (Eastern and Western), and Zuni. Mescalero and Jicarilla Apache are closely related Southern Athabaskan languages, and both are also related to Navajo. Tewa, the Tiwa languages, and Towa belong to the Kiowa-Tanoan language family, and thus all descend from a common ancestor. Keres and Zuni are language isolates with no relatives outside of New Mexico.

Official language

New Mexico's original state constitution of 1911 required all laws be published in both English and Spanish for twenty years after ratification; this requirement was renewed in 1931 and 1943, with some sources stating the state was officially bilingual until 1953. Nonetheless, the constitution does not declare any language "official". While Spanish was permitted in the legislature until 1935, all state officials are required to have a good knowledge of English; consequently, some analysts argue that New Mexico cannot be considered a bilingual state, since not all laws are published in both languages.

However, the state legislature remains constitutionally empowered to publish laws in English and Spanish, and to appropriate funds for translation. Amendments to the New Mexico constitution must be approved by referendum printed on the ballot in both English and Spanish. Certain legal notices must be published in English and Spanish, and the state maintains a list of newspapers for Spanish publication.

With regard to the judiciary, witnesses and defendants have the right to testify in either of the two languages, and monolingual speakers of Spanish have the same right to be considered for jury duty as do speakers of English. In public education, the state has the constitutional obligation to provide bilingual education and Spanish-speaking instructors in school districts where the majority of students are Hispanophone. The constitution also provides that all state citizens who speak neither English nor Spanish have a right to vote, hold public office, and serve on juries.

In 1989, New Mexico became the first of only four states to officially adopt the English Plus resolution, which supports acceptance of non-English languages. In 1995, the state adopted an official bilingual song, "New Mexico – Mi Lindo Nuevo México". In 2008, New Mexico was the first state to officially adopt a Navajo textbook for use in public schools.

Religion

Like most U.S. states, New Mexico is predominantly Christian, with Roman Catholicism and Protestantism each constituting roughly a third of the population. According to Association of Religion Data Archives (ARDA), the largest denominations in 2010 were the Catholic Church (684,941 members); the Southern Baptist Convention (113,452); The Church of Jesus Christ of Latter-day Saints (67,637), and the United Methodist Church (36,424). Approximately one-fifth of residents are unaffiliated with any religion, which includes atheists, agnostics, deists. A 2020 study by the Public Religion Research Institute determined 67% of the population were Christian, with Roman Catholics constituting the largest denominational group.

Roman Catholicism is deeply rooted in New Mexico's history and culture, going back to its settlement by the Spanish in the early 17th century. The oldest Christian church in the continental U.S., and the third oldest in any U.S. state or territory, is the San Miguel Mission in Santa Fe, which was built in 1610. Within the hierarchy of the Catholic Church, New Mexico belongs to the Ecclesiastical Province of Santa Fe. The state has three ecclesiastical districts: the Archdiocese of Santa Fe, the Diocese of Gallup, and the Diocese of Las Cruces. Evangelicalism and nondenominational Christianity have seen growth in the state since the late 20th century: The Billy Graham Evangelistic Association has hosted numerous events in New Mexico, and Albuquerque has several megachurches, which have numerous satellite locations in the state, including Calvary of Albuquerque, Legacy Church, and Sagebrush Church.

New Mexico has been a leading center of the New Age movement since at least the 1960s, attracting adherents from across the country. The state's "thriving New Age network" encompasses various schools of alternative medicine, holistic health, psychic healing, and new religions, as well as festivals, pilgrimage sites, spiritual retreats, and communes. New Mexico's Japanese American community has influenced the state's religious heritage, with Shinto and Zen represented by Kagyu Shenpen Kunchab, Kōbun Chino Otogawa, Upaya Institute and Zen Center. Likewise, Holism is represented in New Mexico, as are associated faiths such as Buddhism and Seventh-day Adventism; a Tibetan Buddhist temple is located at Zuni Mountain Stupa in Grants.

Religious education, art, broadcasting, media exist across religions and faiths in New Mexico, including KHAC, KXXQ, Dar al-Islam, and Intermountain Jewish News. Christian schools in New Mexico are encouraged to receive educational accreditation, and among them are the University of the Southwest, St. Pius High School, Hope Christian, Sandia View Academy, St. Michael's High School, Las Cruces Catholic School, St. Bonaventure Indian School, and Rehoboth Christian School. Albuquerque's growing media sector has made it a popular hub for several national Christian media institutions, such as Trinity Broadcasting Network's KNAT-TV. Christian artistic expression includes the gospel tradition within New Mexico music, contemporary Christian music such as KLYT radio station, and independent media franchise studios such as Heaven Sent Gaming. Several indigenous and Christian religious sites are registered and protected as part of regional and global cultural heritage.

Reflecting centuries of successive migrations and settlements, New Mexico has developed a distinct syncretic folk religion that is centered on Puebloan traditions and Hispano folk Catholicism, with some elements of Diné Bahaneʼ, Apache, Protestant, and Evangelical faiths. This unique religious tradition is sometimes referred to as "Pueblo Christianity" or "Placita Christianity", referring to both the Pueblos and Hispanic town squares. Customs and practices include the maintenance of acequias, Pueblo and Territorial Style churches, ceremonial dances such as the matachines, religious artistic expression of kachinas and santos, religious holidays celebrating saints such as Pueblo Feast Days, Christmas traditions of bizcochitos and farolitos or luminarias, and pilgrimages like that of El Santuario de Chimayo. New Mexico's distinctive faith tradition is believed to reflect the religious naturalism of the state's indigenous and Hispano peoples, who constitute a pseudo ethnoreligious group.

New Mexico's leadership within otherwise disparate traditions such as Christianity, the Native American Church, and New Age movements has been linked to its remote and ancient indigenous spirituality, which emphasized sacred connections to nature, and its over 300 years of syncretized Pueblo and Hispano religious and folk customs. The state's remoteness has likewise been cited as attracting and fostering communities seeking the freedom to practice or cultivate new beliefs. Global spiritual leaders including Billy Graham and Dalai Lama, along with community leaders of Hispanic and Latino Americans and indigenous peoples of the North American Southwest, have remarked on New Mexico being a sacred space.

According to a 2017 survey by the Pew Research Center, New Mexico ranks 18th among the 50 U.S. states in religiosity, 63% of respondents stating they believe in God with certainty, with an additional 20% being fairly certain of the existence of God, while 59% considering religion to be important in their lives and another 20% believe it to be somewhat important.

Economy

Oil and gas production, the entertainment industry, high tech scientific research, tourism, and government spending are important drivers of the state economy. The state government has an elaborate system of tax credits and technical assistance to promote job growth and business investment, especially in new technologies.

As of 2021, New Mexico's gross domestic product was over $95 billion, compared to roughly $80 billion in 2010. State GDP peaked in 2019 at nearly $99 billion but declined in the face of the COVID-19 pandemic. In 2021, the per capita personal income was slightly over $45,800, compared to $31,474 in 2007; it was the third lowest in the country after West Virginia and Mississippi. The percentage of persons below the poverty level has largely plateaued in the 21st century, from 18.4% in 2005 to 18.2% in 2021.

Traditionally dependent on resource extraction, ranching, and railroad transportation, New Mexico has increasingly shifted towards services, high-end manufacturing, and tourism. Since 2017, the state has seen a steady rise in the number of annual visitors, culminating in a record-breaking 39.2 million tourists in 2021, which had a total economic income of $10 billion. New Mexico has also seen greater investment in media and scientific research.

Oil and gas 
New Mexico is the second largest crude oil and ninth largest natural gas producer in the United States; it overtook North Dakota in oil production in July 2021 and is expected to continue expanding. The Permian and San Juan Basins, which are located partly in New Mexico, account for some of these natural resources. In 2000 the value of oil and gas produced was $8.2 billion, and in 2006, New Mexico accounted for 3.4% of the crude oil, 8.5% of the dry natural gas, and 10.2% of the natural gas liquids produced in the United States. However, the boom in hydraulic fracturing and horizontal drilling since the mid-2010s led to a large increase in the production of crude oil from the Permian Basin and other U.S. sources; these developments allowed the United States to again become the world's largest producer of crude oil by 2018. New Mexico's oil and gas operations contribute to the state's above-average release of the greenhouse gas methane, including from a national methane hot spot in the Four Corners area.

In common with other states in the Western U.S., New Mexico receives royalties from the sale of federally owned land to oil and gas companies. It has the highest proportion of federal land with oil and gas, as well as the most lucrative: since the last amendment to the U.S. Mineral Leasing Act in 1987, New Mexico had by far the lowest percent of land sold for the minimum statutory amount of $2 per acre, at just 3%; by contrast, all of Arizona's federal land was sold at the lowest rate, followed by Oregon at 98% and Nevada at 84%. The state had the fourth-highest total acreage sold to the oil and gas industry, at about 1.1 million acres, and the second-highest number of acres currently leased fossil fuel production, at 4.3 million acres, after Wyoming's 9.2 million acres; only 11 percent of these lands, or 474,121 acres, are idle, which is the lowest among Western states. Nevertheless, New Mexico has had recurring disputes and discussions with the U.S. government concerning management and revenue rights over federal land.

Arts and entertainment 

The arts and cultural production industry of New Mexico is valued at $2.9 billion. The fine arts of the American Southwest has its origins in the folk arts of the indigenous and Hispanic peoples in the region. Pueblo pottery, Navajo rugs, religious icons including kachinas and santos, have long been produced in New Mexico and are recognized as a part of the global art world. Georgia O'Keeffe's presence brought with it the recognition of the Santa Fe art scene, and today the city is home to numerous art establishments, including those along Canyon Road. Being the birthplace of William Hanna, and the presence of Chuck Jones, has also given New Mexico a storied history in the animation industry.

New Mexico provides financial incentives for film production. One such program, enacted in 2019, provides benefits to media companies that commit to investing in the state for at least a decade and that utilize local talent, crew, and businesses. The New Mexico Film Office estimated at the end of 2007 that the incentive program had brought more than 85 film projects to the state since 2003 and had added $1.2 billion to the economy. Data for 2021 found direct spending for film production at close to $624 million. In 2018, Netflix chose New Mexico for its first U.S. production hub, pledging to spend over $1 billion over the next decade to create one of the largest film studios in North America at Albuquerque Studios. NBCUniversal followed suit in 2019 with the opening of its own film studio and plans to employ New Mexican actors and crew members.

Local production companies have received coverage in local, national, and international publications. Meow Wolf, an artist collective that began in Santa Fe, has involved leading creatives such as George R. R. Martin and Matt King, and has expanded throughout the Southwest, including Colorado, Nevada, and Texas. It is also the first B Corporation in the entertainment industry. Video production team Cliffdweller Digital, located in Rio Rancho, is best known for the New Mexico True Television travel series and has received numerous Emmy Awards several years in a row. The studio Heaven Sent Gaming in Albuquerque has produced a multimedia fictional universe, along with a New Mexico Cultural Encyclopedia & Lexicon and aywv.art & entertainment journal; their computer science and folklore research has been referenced by universities and media outlets. Blackout Theatre is a theatrical troupe from Albuquerque with numerous recognizable productions; their character skits Lynette LaBurqueña, played by actress Lauren Poole, has been used to advertise the New Mexico State Fair and as an educational device for New Mexico's English dialect at the University of New Mexico.

Country music record labels have a presence in the state, following the former success of Warner Western. During the 1950s to 1960s, Glen Campbell, The Champs, Johnny Duncan, Carolyn Hester, Al Hurricane, Waylon Jennings, Eddie Reeves, and J. D. Souther recorded on equipment by Norman Petty at Clovis. Norman Petty's recording studio was a part of the rock and roll and rockabilly movement of the 1950s, with the distinctive "Route 66 Rockabilly" stylings of Buddy Holly and The Fireballs. Albuquerque has been referred to as the "Chicano Nashville" due to the popularity of regional Mexican and Western music artists from the region. A heritage style of country music, called New Mexico music, is widely popular throughout the southwestern U.S.; outlets for these artists include the radio station KANW, Los 15 Grandes de Nuevo México music awards, and Al Hurricane Jr. hosts Hurricane Fest to honor his father's music legacy.

Technology 
New Mexico is part of the larger Rio Grande Technology Corridor, an emerging alternative to Silicon Valley that consists of a concentration of science and technology institutions stretching from southwestern Colorado to the Gulf of Mexico. The constituent New Mexico Technology Corridor, centered primarily around Albuquerque, hosts a constellation of high technology and scientific research entities, which include federal facilities such as Sandia National Laboratories, Los Alamos National Laboratory, and the Very Large Array; private companies such as Intel, HP, and Facebook; and academic institutions such as the University of New Mexico (UNM), New Mexico State University (NMSU), and New Mexico Tech. Most of these entities form part of an "ecosystem" that links their researchers and resources with private capital, often through initiatives of local, state, and federal governments.

New Mexico has been a science and technology hub since at least the mid-20th century, following heavy federal government investment during the Second World War. Los Alamos was the site of Project Y, the laboratory responsible for designing and developing the world's first atomic bomb for the Manhattan Project. Horticulturist Fabián García developed several new varieties of peppers and other crops at what is now NMSU, which is also a leading space grant college. Robert H. Goddard, credited with ushering the space age, conducted many of his early rocketry tests in Roswell. Astronomer Clyde Tombaugh of Las Cruces discovered Pluto in neighboring Arizona. Personal computer company MITS, which was founded in Albuquerque in 1969, brought about the "microcomputer revolution" with the development of the first commercially successful microcomputer, the Altair 8800; two of its employees, Paul Allen and Bill Gates, went on to found Microsoft in the city in 1975.

The New Mexican government has aimed to develop the state into a major center for technology startups, namely through financial incentives and public-private partnerships. The bioscience sector has experienced particularly robust growth, beginning with the 2013 opening of a BioScience Center in Albuquerque, the state's first private incubator for biotechnology startups; New Mexicans have since founded roughly 150 bioscience companies, which have received more patents than any other sector. In 2017, New Mexico established the Bioscience Authority to foster local industry development; the following year, pharmaceutical company Curia built two large facilities in Albuquerque, and in 2022 announced plans to investment $100 million to expand local operations. The state is also positioning itself to play a leading role in developing quantum computing, quantum dot, and clean energy technologies.

In 2023, the U.S. Department of Energy announced several projects in New Mexico pursuant to the CHIPS and Science Act, which aims to expands domestic semiconductor manufacturing, research and development of new technology, and workforce training; the projects, which will total roughly $8 million, include a new 100,000-square-foot technology incubator for companies, academia, and national laboratories, and a new platform for facilitating the development of tech startups among minority communities. In addition to the federal government, entrepreneurs Richard Branson and Elon Musk, among others, have been heavily investing in technology throughout the Rio Grande and Southwestern U.S.

New Mexico's high altitude, generally clear skies, and sparse population have long fostered astronomical and aerospace activities, beginning with the ancient observatories of the Chaco Canyon culture; the "Space Triangle" between Roswell, Alamogordo, and Las Cruces has seen the highest concentration rocket tests and launches. New Mexico is sometimes considered the birthplace of the U.S. space program, beginning with Goddard's design of the first liquid fuel rocket in Roswell in the 1930s. The first rocket to reach space flew from White Sands Missile Range in 1948, and both NASA and the Department of Defense continue to develop and test rockets there and at the adjacent Holloman Air Force Base. New Mexico has also become a major center for private space flight, hosting the world's first purpose-built commercial spaceport, Spaceport America, which anchors several major aerospace companies and associated contractors, most notably Branson's Virgin Galactic.

In November 2022, the New Mexico State Investment Council, which manages that state's $38 billion sovereign wealth fund, announced it would commit $100 million towards America's Frontier Fund (AFF), a new venture capital firm that will focus on advanced technologies such as microelectronics and semiconductors, advanced manufacturing, artificial intelligence, new energy sources, synthetic biology and quantum sciences.

Agriculture and food production 
Although much of its land is arid, New Mexico has hosted a variety of agricultural activities for at least 2,500 years, centered mostly on the Rio Grande and its tributaries. This is helped by its long history of acequias, along with other farming and ranching methods within New Mexico. Specialty areas include various cash crops, cattle ranching, acequia farming, game and fish.

The state vegetables are chile peppers and pinto beans, with the former being the most famous and valuable crop: According to the 2017 Census of Agriculture, New Mexico ranked first in the nation for chile pepper acreage, with Doña Ana and Luna counties placing first and second among U.S. counties in this regard. The numerous varieties of New Mexico chile sold close to $40 million in 2021, while dry beans accounted for $7.6 million that year. For nut production, New Mexico is the fifth-largest producer of pecans in the U.S., it is one of the only states commercially producing pistachios, and its piñon harvest (pine nut) is a protected commodity.

Dairy is the state's largest commodity, with sales of milk alone totaling $1.3 billion. Dean Foods owns the Creamland brand in New Mexico, the brand was originally founded in 1937 to expand a cooperative dairy venture known as the Albuquerque Dairy Association. Local cheese production includes the brands Tucumcari Mountain Cheese Factory and Old Windmill Dairy, creating a variety of cheeses including cheddar, feta, and New Mexican style cheeses infusing flavors like green chile, Chimayo pepper, and others. Southwest Cheese Company in Clovis is the among largest cheese production facilities in the United States.

Caballero history among the indigenous and Hispano communities in New Mexico have resulted in historic large-scale ranch lands throughout the state, most of which are within historically Apache, Navajo, Pueblo, and Spanish land grants. New Mexican wagyu is receiving recognition and accolades, as the large land area for the cows gives them a low stress life and raises them "in a way that echoes the Japanese method." Wild game and fish also has a heritage in the state, with indigenous Rio Grande cutthroat trout, rainbow trout, crawdads, and venison being sought after on the market.

Grain and bread production in New Mexico includes major brands like General Mills and Grupo Bimbo, as well as local producers including the traditional New Mexican bakery Golden Crown Panaderia. The New Mexican tortilla brand Albuquerque Tortilla Company is owned and distributed by Gruma, but maintains its traditional New Mexico and Southwestern style tortilla recipe. Following the sale of Albuquerque Tortilla Company to Gruma, the Martinez family created the Authentic New Mexican brand. Other tortilla companies in the state include La Mexicana Tortilla, La Primera Tortilla, Las Cruces Tortilla, New Mexico Tortilla, and Santa Fe Tortilla.

Shelf-stable and frozen foods from New Mexico are found nationally and internationally. Brands including 505 Southwestern, Bueno Foods, Hatch Chile Company, New Mexico Piñon Coffee Company, Young Guns Chile, and Zia Hatch Chile are distributed to grocery stores and markets. Restaurants like Sadie's distribute their salsas globally as well, they and other New Mexican brands are known to collaborate with nationally and internationally available companies to create distinctive products. New Mexico wine has wide-scale recognition and distribution, due to its prominent history in the region starting in the 16th century; Gruet Winery produces the Sauvage brand of wines and accoladed sparkling wines, other wineries in New Mexico have likewise received accolades. Since the 1980s, breweries in New Mexico have developed, especially due to the well-liked Neomexicanus hops which are indigenous to the region.

Restaurant chains Blake's Lotaburger, Boba Tea Company, Dion's Pizza, Little Anita's, Mac's Steak in the Rough, New Mexico Piñon Coffee House, The Paleta Bar, and Twisters, are headquartered in the state. Chains like Blake's Lotaburger, Little Anita's, Mac's Steak in the Rough, New Mexico Piñon Coffee House, Sadie's, and Twisters specialize in New Mexican cuisine. Some companies like the Allsup's gas stations have consumer foods, like chimichangas. Many of these chains can be found throughout the Southwestern US, and some like The Paleta Bar have become national chains.

Tourism 
New Mexico's distinctive culture, rich artistic scene, favorable climate, and diverse geography have long been major drivers of tourism. As early as 1880, the state was a major destination for travelers suffering from respiratory illnesses (particularly tuberculosis), with its altitude and aridity believed to be beneficial to the lungs. Since the mid aughts, New Mexico has seen a steady rise in annual visitors, welcoming a record-breaking 39.2 million tourists in 2021.

New Mexico's unique culinary scene has garnered increasing national attention, including numerous James Beard Foundation Awards. The state has been featured in major travel television shows such as Diners, Drive-Ins and Dives, Anthony Bourdain: Parts Unknown, Man v. Food Nation, and others. Outdoor recreation in the area is fueled by a variety of internationally recognized nature reserves, public parks, ski resorts, hiking trails, and hunting and fishing areas.

New Mexico's government is actively involved in promoting tourism, launching the nation's first state publication, New Mexico Magazine, in 1923. The New Mexico Tourism Department administers the magazine and is also responsible for the New Mexico True campaign.

Government

Federal government spending is a major driver of the New Mexico economy. In 2005, the federal government spent $2.03 on New Mexico for every dollar of tax revenue collected from the state, higher than any other state in the Union. By 2017, federal expenditure per state tax dollar increased to $2.34, the third highest after Virginia and Kentucky. New Mexico received $9,624 per resident in federal services, or roughly $20 billion more than what the state pays in federal taxes. The state governor's office estimated that the federal government spends roughly $7.8 billion annually in services such as healthcare, infrastructure development, and public welfare.

Federal employees make up 3.4% of New Mexico's labor force. Many federal jobs in the state relate to the military: the state hosts three air force bases (Kirtland Air Force Base, Holloman Air Force Base, and Cannon Air Force Base); a testing range (White Sands Missile Range); and an army proving ground (Fort Bliss's McGregor Range). A 2005 study by New Mexico State University estimated that 11.7% of the state's total employment arises directly or indirectly from military spending. New Mexico is also home to two major federal research institutions: the Los Alamos National Laboratory and Sandia National Laboratories. The former alone accounts for 24,000 direct and indirect jobs and over $3 billion in annual federal investment.

Economic incentives
New Mexico provides a number of economic incentives to businesses operating in the state, including various types of tax credits and tax exemptions. Most incentives are based on job creation: state and local governments are permitted to provide land, buildings, and infrastructure to businesses that will generate employment. Several municipalities impose an Economic Development Gross Receipts Tax (a form of Municipal Infrastructure GRT) to pay for these infrastructure improvements and for marketing their areas.

The New Mexico Finance Authority operates the New Market Tax Credits (NMTC) to provide greater access to financing for new, expanding, or relocating businesses in "highly distressed" areas (defined by metrics such as poverty above 30% and median family income below 60% of the statewide median).

Taxation

New Mexico is one of the largest tax havens in the U.S., offering numerous economic incentives and tax breaks on personal and corporate income. It does not levy taxes on inheritance, estate, or sales. Personal income tax rates range from 1.7% to 5.9% within five income brackets; the top marginal rate was increased from 4.9% in 2021 per a 2019 law. Active-duty military salaries are exempt from state income tax, as is income earned by Native American members of federally recognized tribes on tribal land.

New Mexico imposes a Gross Receipts Tax (GRT) on many transactions, which may even include some governmental receipts. This resembles a sales tax but, unlike the sales taxes in many states, it applies to services as well as tangible goods. Normally, the provider or seller passes the tax on to the purchaser; however, legal incidence and burden apply to the business, as an excise tax. GRT is imposed by the state and by some counties and municipalities. As of 2021, the combined tax rate ranged from 5.125% to 9.063%.

Property tax is imposed on real property by the state, by counties, and by school districts. In general, personal use personal property is not subject to property taxation. On the other hand, property tax is levied on most business-use personal property. The taxable value of property is one-third the assessed value. A tax rate of about 30 mills is applied to the taxable value, resulting in an effective tax rate of about 1%. In the 2005 tax year, the average millage was about 26.47 for residential property, and 29.80 for non-residential property. Assessed values of residences cannot be increased by more than 3% per year unless the residence is remodeled or sold. Property tax deductions are available for military veterans and heads of household.

A 2021 analysis by the nonprofit Tax Foundation placed New Mexico 23rd in business tax climate; its property taxes were found to be the least burdensome in the U.S., while taxation for unemployment insurance and on corporations each ranked as the ninth least burdensome.

Wealth and poverty 
New Mexico is one of the poorest states in the U.S. and has long struggled with poverty. Its poverty rate of roughly 18% is among the highest in the country, exceeded only by Louisiana and Mississippi. In 2017, nearly 30% of New Mexico's children were in poverty, which is 40% higher than the national average. The vast majority of births (72%) were financed by Medicaid, a federal healthcare program for the poor, the highest of any state. As of May 2021, around 44% of residents were enrolled in Medicaid.

New Mexico is one of only eight states without a billionaire, ranking 39th in the share of households with more than $1 million in wealth (5%), and among fourteen states without a Fortune 500 company. The state has a relatively high level of income disparity, with a Gini coefficient of 0.4769, albeit below the national average of 0.486. Household income is slightly less than $47,000, which is the fourth lowest in the U.S. The unemployment rate for June 2021 is 7.9%, tied with Connecticut as the highest in the country, and close to the peak of 8.0% for June–October 2010, following the 2007-2008 financial crisis.

The New Mexico government has enacted several policies to address chronic poverty, including approving a minimum wage increase in January 2021 and requiring paid sick leave. The state's minimum wage of $10.50 is higher than that of the federal government and 34 other states; it is set to increase to $11.50 on January 1, 2022, and $12.00 on January 1, 2023. Additionally, counties and municipalities have set their own minimum wages; Santa Fe County enacted a "Living Wage Ordinance" on March 1, 2021, mandating $12.32.

The New Mexico Legislature is considering implementing a statewide guaranteed basic income program targeting poorer residents; if enacted, it would be only the second U.S. state after California with such a policy. In August 2021, Santa Fe announced a one-year pilot program that would provide a "stability stipend" of $400 monthly to 100 parents under the age of 30 who attend Santa Fe Community College; the results of the program will determine whether the state government follows suit with its own basic income proposals. Las Cruces, the state's second largest city, is officially discussing the enactment of a similar program.

Transportation

New Mexico has long been an important corridor for trade and migration. The builders of the ruins at Chaco Canyon also created a radiating network of roads from the mysterious settlement. Chaco Canyon's trade function shifted to Casas Grandes in the present-day Mexican state of Chihuahua; however, north–south trade continued. The pre-Columbian trade with Mesoamerican cultures included northbound exotic birds, seashells and copper. Turquoise, pottery, and salt were some of the goods transported south along the Rio Grande. Present-day New Mexico's pre-Columbian trade is especially remarkable for being undertaken on foot. The north–south trade route later became a path for horse-drawn colonists arriving from New Spain as well as trade and communication; later called El Camino Real de Tierra Adentro, it was among the four "royal roads" that were crucial lifelines to Spanish colonial possessions in North America.

The Santa Fe Trail was the 19th-century territory's vital commercial and military highway link to the Eastern United States. All with termini in Northern New Mexico, the Camino Real, the Santa Fe Trail and the Old Spanish Trail are all recognized as National Historic Trails. New Mexico's latitude and low passes made it an attractive east–west transportation corridor. As a territory, the Gadsden Purchase increased New Mexico's land area for the purpose of constructing a southern transcontinental railroad, that of the Southern Pacific Railroad. Another transcontinental railroad was completed by the Atchison, Topeka and Santa Fe Railway. The railroads essentially replaced the earlier trails but prompted a population boom. Early transcontinental auto trails later crossed the state, bringing more migrants. Railroads were later supplemented or replaced by a system of highways and airports. Today, New Mexico's Interstate Highways approximate the earlier land routes of the Camino Real, the Santa Fe Trail and the transcontinental railroads.

Road

Personal automobiles remain the primary means of transportation for most New Mexicans, especially in rural areas. The state had 59,927 route miles of highway , of which 7,037 receive federal aid. The former number has increased with the upgrading of roads near Pojoaque, Santa Fe and Las Cruces to freeways. Notable bridges include the Rio Grande Gorge Bridge near Taos. Larger cities in New Mexico typically have some form of public transportation by road; ABQ RIDE is the largest such system in the state. Rural and intercity public transportation by road is provided by Americanos USA, LLC, Greyhound Lines and several government operators.

New Mexico is plagued by poor road conditions, with roughly a third of its roadways suffering from "inadequate state and local funding". , 703 highway bridges, or one percent, were declared "structurally deficient" or "structurally obsolete". Data from 2019 found 207 bridges and more than 3,822 miles of highway in less than subpar condition, resulting in greater commute times and higher costs in vehicles maintenance.

New Mexico has historically had a problem with drunk driving, though this has lessened: According to the Los Angeles Times, the state once had the nation's highest alcohol-related crash rates but ranked 25th in this regard by July 2009. The highway traffic fatality rate was 1.9 per million miles traveled in 2000, the 13th highest rate among U.S. states. A 2022 report cited poor road as a major factor in New Mexico's continually high traffic fatalities; between 2015 and 2019, close 1,900 people were killed in automotive crashes in the state.

Highways

New Mexico has only three Interstate Highways: Interstate 10 travels southwest from the Arizona state line near Lordsburg to the area between Las Cruces and Anthony, near El Paso, Texas; Interstate 25 is a major north–south interstate highway starting from Las Cruces to the Colorado state line near Raton; and Interstate 40 is a major east–west interstate highway starting from the Arizona state line west of Gallup to the Texas state line east from Tucumcari. In Albuquerque, I-25 and I-40 meet at a stack interchange called The BigI. The state is tied with Delaware, North Dakota, Puerto Rico, and Rhode Island in having the fewest primary interstate routes, which is partly a reflection of its rugged geography and sparse population.

All but seven of its 33 counties are served by U.S. routes, with most of the remainder connected by Interstate Highways. Most routes were built in 1926 by the state government and are still managed and maintained by state or local authorities.

The most famous route in New Mexico, if not the United States, was U.S. 66, colloquially known as the nation's "Mother Road" for its scenic beauty and importance to migrants fleeing West from the Dust Bowl of the 1930s. The road crossed through northern New Mexico, connecting the cities of Albuquerque and Gallup, before being replaced by I-40 in 1985. Much of U.S. 66 remains in use for tourism and has been preserved for historical significance. Another famous route was U.S. 666, which ran south to north along the western portion of the state, serving the Four Corners area. It was known as the "Devil's Highway" due to the number 666 denoting the "Number of the Beast" in Christianity; this numerical designation, as well as its high fatality rate was subject to controversy, superstition, and numerous cultural references. U.S. 666 was subsequently renamed U.S. Route 491 in 2003.
Many existing and former highways in New Mexico are recognized for their aesthetic, cultural, or historical significance, particularly for tourism purposes. The state hosts ten out of 184 "America's Byways", which are federally designated for preservation due to their scenic beauty or national importance.

Rail 

There were 2,354 route miles of railroads in the year 2000; this number increased by a few miles with the opening of the Rail Runner's extension to Santa Fe in 2006. In addition to local railroads and other tourist lines, the state jointly owns and operates a heritage narrow-gauge steam railroad, the Cumbres and Toltec Scenic Railway, with the state of Colorado since 1970. Narrow-gauge railroads once connected many communities in the northern part of the state, from Farmington to Santa Fe. No fewer than 100 railroads of various names and lineage have operated in the state at some point. New Mexico's rail transportation system reached its height in terms of length following admission as a state; in 1914, eleven railroads operated 3124 route miles.

Railroad surveyors arrived in New Mexico in the 1850s shortly after it became a U.S. territory. The first railroads incorporated in 1869, and the first railway became operational in 1878 with the Atchison, Topeka & Santa Fe Railway (ATSF), which entered via the lucrative and contested Raton Pass. The ATSF eventually reached El Paso, Texas in 1881, and with the entry of the Southern Pacific Railroad from the Arizona Territory in 1880, created the nation's second transcontinental railroad, with a junction at Deming. The Denver & Rio Grande Railway, which generally used narrow gauge equipment in New Mexico, entered the territory from Colorado, beginning service to Española in December 1880. These first railroads were built as long-distance corridors; later railroad construction also targeted resource extraction.  

The rise of rail transportation was a major source of demographic and economic growth in the state, with many settlements expanding or being established shortly thereafter. As early as 1878, the ATSF promoted tourism in the region with an emphasis on Native American imagery. Named trains often reflected the territory they traveled: Super Chief, the streamlined successor to the Chief; Navajo, an early transcontinental tourist train; and Cavern, a through car operation connecting Clovis and Carlsbad (by the early 1950s as train 23–24), were some of the named passenger trains of the ATSF that connoted New Mexico, The Super Chief became a favorite of early Hollywood stars and among the most famous named trains in the U.S.; it was known for its luxury and exoticness, with cars bearing the name of regional Native American tribes and outfitted with the artwork of many local artistsbut also for its speed: as brief as 39 hours 45 minutes westbound from Chicago to Los Angeles.At its height, passenger train service once connected nine of New Mexico's present ten most populous cities (the sole exception is Rio Rancho); currently, only Albuquerque and Santa Fe are connected by a rail network. With the decline of most intercity rail service in the U.S. in the late 1960s, New Mexico was left with minimal services; no less than six daily long-distance roundtrip trains, supplemented by many branch-line and local trains, served New Mexico in the early 1960s. Declines in passenger revenue, but not necessarily ridership, prompted many railroads to turn over their passenger services in truncated form to Amtrak, a state-owned enterprise. Amtrak, also known as the National Passenger Railroad Corporation, began operating the two extant long-distance routes on May 1, 1971.

Resurrection of passenger rail service from Denver to El Paso, a route once plied in part by the ATSF's El Pasoan, has been proposed; in the 1980s, then–Governor Toney Anaya suggested building a high-speed rail line connecting the two cities with New Mexico's major cities. In 2004, the Colorado-based nonprofit Front Range Commuter Rail was established with the goal of connecting Wyoming and New Mexico with high-speed rail; however, it became inactive in 2011.Since 2006, a state owned, privately run commuter railway, the New Mexico Rail Runner Express, has served the Albuquerque metropolitan area, connecting the city proper with Santa Fe and other communities. The system expanded in 2008 with the adding of the BNSF Railway's line from Belen to a few miles south of Lamy. Phase II of Rail Runner extended the line northward to Santa Fe from the Sandoval County station, the northernmost station under Phase I service; the service now connects Santa Fe, Sandoval, Bernalillo, and Valencia counties. Rail Runner operates scheduled service seven days per week, connecting Albuquerque's population base and central business district to downtown Santa Fe with up to eight roundtrips in a day; the section of the line running south to Belen is served less frequently.

Amtrak's Southwest Chief passes through daily at stations in Gallup, Albuquerque, Lamy, Las Vegas, and Raton, offering connections to Los Angeles, Chicago and intermediate points. The Sunset Limited makes stops three times a week in both directions at Lordsburg, and Deming, serving Los Angeles, New Orleans and intermediate points. The Sunset Limited is the successor to the Southern Pacific Railroad's train of the same name and operates exclusively on Union Pacific trackage in New Mexico.

New Mexico is served by two of the nation's ten class I railroads, which denote the highest revenue railways for freight: the BNSF Railway and the Union Pacific Railroad. Together they operate 2,200 route miles of railway in the state.

Aerospace

New Mexico has four primary commercial airports that are served by most major domestic and international airliners. Albuquerque International Sunport is the state's main aerial port of entry and by far the largest airport: It is the only one designated a medium-sized hub by the Federal Aviation Administration, serving millions of passengers annually.

The only other comparatively large airports are Lea County Regional Airport, Roswell International Air Center, and Santa Fe Regional Airport, which have varying degrees of service by major airlines. Most airports in New Mexico are small, general aviation hubs operated by municipal and county governments, and usually served solely by local and regional commuter airlines.

Due to its sparse population and many isolated, rural communities, New Mexico ranks among the states most reliant on Essential Air Service, a federal program that maintains a minimal level of scheduled air service to communities that are otherwise unprofitable.

Spaceport America 
New Mexico hosts the world's first operational and purpose-built commercial spaceport, Spaceport America, located in Upham, near Truth or Consequences. It is operated by the state-backed New Mexico Spaceport Authority (NMSA). Rocket launches began in April 2007, with the spaceport officially opening in 2011. Tenants include HAPSMobile, UP Aerospace, SpinLaunch, and Virgin Galactic.

Over 300 suborbital flights have been successfully launched from Spaceport America since 2006, with the most notable being Virgin Galactic's VSS Unity on May 22, 2021, which made New Mexico the third U.S. state to launch humans into space, after California and Florida.

On October 22, 2021, Spaceport America was the site of the first successfully tested vacuum-sealed "suborbital accelerator", which aims to offer a significantly more economical alternative to launching satellites via rockets. Conducted by Spaceport tenant SpinLaunch, the test is the first of roughly 30 demonstrations being planned.

Government and politics

The Constitution of New Mexico was adopted by popular referendum in 1911. It establishes a republican form of government based on popular sovereignty and a separation of powers. New Mexico has a bill of rights modeled on its federal counterpart, but with more expansive rights and freedoms; for example, victims of certain serious crimes, such as aggravated battery and sexual assault, have explicit rights to privacy, dignity, and the timely adjudication of their case. Major state issues may be decided by popular vote, while the constitution may be amended by a majority vote of both lawmakers and the electorate.

Governmental structure 
Mirroring the federal system, the New Mexico government consists of executive, legislative, and judicial departments. The executive is led by the governor and other popularly elected officials, including the lieutenant governor (elected on the same ticket as the governor), attorney general, secretary of state, state auditor, state treasurer, and commissioner of public lands. New Mexico's governor is granted more authority than those of other states, with the power to appoint most high-ranking officials in the cabinet and other state agencies.

The legislative branch consists of the bicameral New Mexico Legislature, comprising the 70-member House of Representatives and the 42-member Senate. Members of the House are elected to two-year terms, while those of the Senate are elected every four years. New Mexican legislators are unique in the U.S. for being volunteers, receiving only a daily stipend while in session; this "citizen legislature" dates back to New Mexico's admission as a state, and is considered a source of civic pride.

The judiciary is headed by the New Mexico Supreme Court, the state's highest court, which primarily adjudicates appeals from lower courts or government agencies. It is made up of five judges popularly elected every eight years with overlapping terms. Below the state supreme court is the New Mexico Court of Appeals, which has intermediate appellate jurisdiction statewide. New Mexico has 13 judicial districts with circuit courts of general jurisdiction, as well as various municipal, magistrate, and probate courts of limited jurisdiction.

New Mexico is organized into a number of local governments consisting of counties, municipalities, and special districts.

Politics
Since 2018, New Mexico has been led by Governor Michelle Lujan Grisham and Lieutenant Governor Howie Morales, both of the Democratic Party. All constitutional officers are currently Democrats, including Secretary of State Maggie Toulouse Oliver, Attorney General Hector Balderas, State Auditor Brian Colón, State Land Commissioner Stephanie Garcia Richard, and State Treasurer Tim Eichenberg.

Both chambers of the New Mexico State Legislature have Democratic majorities: 26 Democrats and 16 Republicans in the Senate, and 47 Democrats and 23 Republicans in the House of Representatives. Likewise, the state is represented in the U.S. Senate by Democrats Martin Heinrich and Ben Ray Luján. The state's three delegates to the U.S. House of Representatives are Democrats Melanie Stansbury, Gabe Vasquez, and Teresa Leger Fernandez, representing the first, second, and third districts, respectively.

Since achieving statehood in 1912, New Mexico has been carried by the national popular vote winner in every presidential election of the past 104 years, except 1976, when Gerald Ford won the state by 2% but lost the national popular vote by 2%. In all but three elections1976, 2000, and 2016the candidate who won New Mexico won the presidency. Until 2008, New Mexico was traditionally a swing state in presidential elections. The 1992 election of Bill Clinton marked the first time the state was won by a Democrat since Lyndon B. Johnson in 1964. Al Gore narrowly carried the state in 2000 by 366 votes, and George W. Bush won in 2004 by less than 6,000 votes. The election of Barack Obama in 2008 marked the state's transition into a relatively reliably Democratic stronghold in a largely Republican region; Obama was also the first Democrat to win a majority of New Mexico votes since Johnson. Obama won again in 2012, followed by Hillary Clinton in 2016, and Joe Biden in 2020.

State politics, while decidedly Democratic leaning, have also been idiosyncratic: New Mexico's demographics have been described as atypical of most traditional liberal states with "political ideology [being] less important" than the profile or outreach efforts of the individual candidate. Consequently, while registered Democrats outnumber registered Republicans by nearly 200,000, New Mexico voters have historically favored moderate to conservative candidates of both parties at the state and federal levels, with Democrats' relative success attributed to a "multifaceted" strategy. Lujan Grisham succeeded two-term Republican governor Susana Martinez on January 1, 2019; Gary Johnson was governor from 1995 to 2003 as a Republican, but in 2012 and 2016 ran for president from the Libertarian Party. New Mexico's Second Congressional District is among the most competitive in the country: Republican Herrell narrowly lost to Democrat Xochitl Torres Small in 2018 but retook her seat in 2020, subsequently losing to Democrat Gabe Vasquez in 2022.

New Mexico's relatively moderate and bipartisan political culture has been attributed to its history: the Republican Party was the first to incorporate Hispanic and Native voices into leadership roles, such as territorial governor Miguel Antonio Otero and state governor and U.S. senator Octaviano Ambrosio Larrazolo, who was the first Mexican American and first Latino member of the Senate. Republican president Theodore Roosevelt had much respect for the Hispanos, Mexican Americans, and indigenous communities of New Mexico, as many of them had been a part of his Rough Riders. Due to their historically positive connections to the state's heritage, the Republican and Democratic parties of New Mexico are each relatively robust, and New Mexico is considered bellwether purple state. According to Pew Research, the largest political ideology among New Mexicans is political moderate at 36%, while 34% are conservatives, 23% are liberal, and 7% stated they did not know.

Recent election cycles within the past decade have seen moderate incumbents replaced by progressive Democrats in cities like Albuquerque, Santa Fe, and Las Cruces, with conservative Republicans being elected in rural areas. Democrats in the state are usually strongest in the Santa Fe area, parts of the Albuquerque metro area (such as the southeast and central areas, including the affluent Nob Hill neighborhood and the vicinity of the University of New Mexico), Northern and West Central New Mexico, and most Native American reservations, particularly the Navajo Nation. Republicans have traditionally had their strongholds in the eastern and southern parts of the state, the Farmington area, Rio Rancho, and the newly developed areas in the northwest mesa. Albuquerque's Northeast Heights have historically leaned Republican but have become a key swing area for Democrats in recent election cycles.

A 2020 study ranked New Mexico as the 20th hardest state for citizens to vote, due mostly to the inaccessibility of polling stations among many isolated communities.

Female minority representation 
New Mexico has elected more women of color to public office than any other U.S. state. While the trend is partly reflective of the state's disproportionately high Hispanic and indigenous populations, it also reflects longstanding cultural and political trends: In 1922, Soledad Chávez Chacón was the first woman elected secretary of state of New Mexico, and the first Hispanic woman elected to statewide office in the United States. Republican governor Susana Martinez was the first Hispanic female governor in the United States, and Democrat congresswoman Deb Haaland was among the first Native American women elected to the U.S. Congress.

Research by the Center for American Women and Politics at Rutgers University found that two-thirds of all nonwhite women who have ever been elected governor in the U.S. are from New Mexico, including the current governor, Lujan Grisham. The state also accounts for nearly one-third of the women of color who have served in any statewide executive office, such as lieutenant governor and secretary of state, a distinction shared by only ten other states. New Mexico also has a relatively high percentage of state legislators who are women of color, which at 16% is the sixth highest in the nation.

New Mexico is described as a "national leader in electing female legislators". As of January 2023, it ranked sixth in the number of female state legislators (43.8%), with women comprising a majority of the New Mexico House of Representatives (53%) and over a quarter of the Senate (29%). Women also hold a majority of seats on the state Supreme Court and the Court of Appeals. At the federal level, two out of three congressional districts are represented by women.

Local government 

Local government in New Mexico consists primarily of counties and municipalities. There are 33 counties, of which the most populous is Bernalillo, which contains the state's largest city, Albuquerque. Counties are usually governed by an elected five-member county commission, sheriff, assessor, clerk and treasurer. A municipality may call itself a village, town, or city, with no distinction in law and no correlation to any particular form of government. Municipal elections are non-partisan. In addition, limited local authority can be vested in special districts and landowners' associations.

Law 
New Mexico is one of 23 states without the death penalty, becoming the 15th state to abolish capital punishment in 2009.

The state has among the most permissive firearms laws in the country. Its constitution explicitly enshrines the right to bear arms and prevents local governments from regulating gun ownership. Residents may purchase any firearm deemed legal under federal law without a permit. There are no waiting periods under state law for picking up a firearm after it has been purchased, nor any restrictions on magazine capacity. Additionally, New Mexico is a "shall-issue" state for concealed carry permits, thus giving applicants a presumptive right to receive a license without giving a compelling reason.

Before December 2013, New Mexico law was silent on the issue of same-sex marriage. The issuance of marriage licenses to same-sex couples was determined at the county level, with some county clerks issuing marriage licenses to same-sex couples and others not. In December 2013, the New Mexico Supreme Court issued a unanimous ruling directing all county clerks to issue marriage licenses to same-sex couples, thereby making New Mexico the 17th state to recognize same-sex marriage statewide.

Based on 2008 data, New Mexico had 146 law enforcement agencies across the state, county, and municipal levels. State law enforcement is statutorily administered by the Department of Public Safety (DPS). The New Mexico State Police is a division of the DPS with jurisdiction over all crimes in the state. As of 2008, New Mexico had over 5,000 sworn police officers, a ratio of 252 per 100,000 residents, which is roughly the same as the nation.

In April 2021, New Mexico became the 18th state to legalize cannabis for recreational use; possession, personal cultivation, and retail sales are permitted under certain conditions, while relevant marijuana-related arrests and convictions are expunged. New Mexico has long pioneered loosening cannabis restrictions: In 1978, it was the first to pass legislation allowing the medical use of marijuana in some form, albeit restricted to a federal research program. In 1999, Republican Governor Gary Johnson became the highest-ranking elected official in the U.S. to publicly endorse drug legalization. Medicinal marijuana was fully legalized in 2007, making New Mexico the 12th state to do so, and the fourth via legislative action. In 2019, it was the first U.S. state to decriminalize possession of drug paraphernalia.

As of June 2022, New Mexico has one of the nation's most permissive abortion laws: Elective abortion care is legal at all stages of pregnancy, without restrictions such as long waiting periods and mandated parental consent. In 2021, the state repealed a 1969 "trigger law" that had banned most abortion procedures, which would have come into effect following the U.S. Supreme Court's ruling in Dobbs v. Jackson Women's Health Organization. In response to the Dobbs decision, which held that abortion was not a constitutional right, New Mexico's governor issued an executive order protecting abortion providers from out-of-state litigation, in anticipation of the influx of nonresidents seeking abortions.

Fiscal policy 
On a per capita basis, New Mexico's government has one of the largest state budgets, at $9,101 per resident. As of 2017, the state had an S&P Global Rating of AA+, denoting a very strong capacity to meet financial commitments alongside a very low credit risk.

New Mexico has two constitutionally mandated permanent funds: The Land Grant Permanent Fund (LGPF), which was established upon statehood in 1912, and the Severance Tax Permanent Fund (STPF), which was created in 1973 during the oil boom. Both funds derive revenue from rents, royalties, and bonuses related to the state's extensive oil, gas, and mining operations; the vast majority of the LGPF's distributions are earmarked for "common (public) schools", while all distributions from the STPF are allocated to the LGPF.  As of 2020, the Land Grant Permanent Fund was valued at $21.6 billion, while the Severance Tax Permanent Fund was worth $5.8 billion.

Education

Due to its relatively low population and numerous federally funded research facilities, New Mexico had the highest concentration of Ph.D. holders of any state in 2000. Los Alamos County, which hosts the eponymous national laboratory, leads the state in the most post-secondary degree holders, at 38.7% of residents, or 4,899 of 17,950. However, New Mexico routinely ranks near the bottom in studies measuring the quality of primary and secondary school education.

By national standards, New Mexico has one of the highest concentrations of persons who did not finish high school or have some college education, albeit by a low margin: Slightly more than 14% of residents did not have a high school diploma, compared to the national rate of 11.4%, the fifth lowest out of 52 U.S. states and territories. Almost a quarter of people over 25 (23.9%) did not complete college, compared with 21% nationally. New Mexico ranks among the bottom ten states in the proportion of residents with a bachelor's degree or higher (27.7%), but 21st in Ph.D. earners (12.2%); the national average is 33.1% and 12.8%, respectively. In 2020, the number of doctorate recipients was 300, placing the state 34th in the nation.

In 2018, a state judge issued a landmark ruling that "New Mexico is violating the constitutional rights of at-risk students by failing to provide them with sufficient education", in particularly those with indigenous, non-English-speaking, and low-income backgrounds. The court ordered the governor and legislature to provide an adequate system by April 2019; in response, New Mexico increased teacher salaries, funded an extended school year, expanded prekindergarten childhood education programs, and developed a budget formula for delivering more funding to schools that serve at-risk and low-income students. Nevertheless, many activists and public officials contend that these efforts continue to fall short, particularly with respect to Native American schools and students.

Primary and secondary education

The New Mexico Public Education Department oversees the operation of primary and secondary schools; individual school districts directly operate and staff said schools.

In January 2022, New Mexico became the first state in the U.S. to recruit national guardsmen and state workers to serve as substitute teachers due to staffing shortages caused by COVID-19. Partly in response to pandemic-related shortages, on March 1, 2022, Governor Grisham signed into law four bills to increase the salaries and benefits of teachers and other school staff, particularly in entry-level positions.

Postsecondary education

New Mexico has 41 accredited, degree-granting institutions; twelve are private and 29 are state-funded, including four tribal colleges. Additionally, select students can attend certain institutions in Colorado, at in-state tuition rates, pursuant to a reciprocity program between the two states.

Graduates of four-year colleges in New Mexico have some of the lowest student debt burdens in the U.S.; the class of 2017 owed an average of $21,237 compared with a national average of $28,650, according to the Institute for College Access & Success.

New Mexico ranked 13th in the 2022 Social Mobility Index (SMI), which measures the extent to which economically disadvantaged students (with family incomes below the national median) have access to colleges and universities with lower tuition and indebtedness and higher job prospects.

Major research universities 
 University of New Mexico at Albuquerque
 New Mexico State University at Las Cruces
 New Mexico Institute of Mining & Technology at Socorro

Regional state universities
 Eastern New Mexico University at Portales
 New Mexico Highlands University at Las Vegas
 Western New Mexico University at Silver City

Lottery scholarship

New Mexico is one of eight states that fund college scholarships through the state lottery. The state requires that the lottery put 30% of its gross sales into the scholarship fund.
The scholarship is available to residents who graduated from a state high school, and attend a state university full-time while maintaining a 2.5 GPA or higher. It covered 100% of tuition when it was first instated in 1996, decreased to 90%, then dropped to 60% in 2017. The value slightly increased in 2018, and new legislation was passed to outline what funds are available per type of institution.

Opportunity scholarship 
In September 2019, New Mexico announced a plan to make tuition at its public colleges and universities free for all state residents, regardless of family income. The proposal was described as going further than any other existing state or federal plan or program at the time. In March 2022, New Mexico became the first state to offer free college tuition for all residents, after the legislature passed a bipartisan bill allocating almost 1 percent of the state budget toward covering tuition and fees at all 29 public colleges, universities, community colleges, and tribal colleges. The program, which takes effect July 1, 2022, is described as among the most ambitious and generous in the country, as it is available to all residents regardless of income, work status, or legal status, and is provided without taking into account other scholarships and sources of financial aid.

Culture

New Mexican culture is a unique fusion of indigenous, Spanish, Hispanic, and American influences. The state bears some of the oldest evidence of human habitation, with thousands of years of indigenous heritage giving way to centuries of successive migration and settlement by Spanish, Mexican, and Anglo-American colonists. The intermingling of these diverse groups is reflected in New Mexico's demographics, toponyms, cuisine, dialect, and identity. The state's distinct culture and image are reflected in part by the fact that many Americans do not know it is part of the U.S.; this misconception variably elicits frustration, amusement, or even pride among New Mexicans for evidencing their unique heritage.

Like other states in the American Southwest, New Mexico bears the legacy of the "Old West" period of American westward expansion, characterized by cattle ranching, cowboys, pioneers, the Santa Fe Trail, and conflicts among and between settlers and Native Americans. The state's vast and diverse geography, sparse population, and abundance of ghost towns have contributed to its enduring frontier image and atmosphere. Many fictional works of the Western genre are set or produced in New Mexico.

Compared to other Western states, New Mexico's Spanish and Mexican heritage remain more visible and enduring, due to it having been the oldest, most populous, and most important province in New Spain's northern periphery. However, this legacy is alleged to have been marginalized by persistent American biases and misconceptions regarding Spanish colonial history.

New Mexico is an important center of Native American culture. Some 200,000 residents, about one-tenth of the population, are of indigenous descent, ranking third in size, and second proportionally, nationwide. There are 23 federally recognized tribal nations, each with its distinct culture, history, and identity. Both the Navajo and Apache share Athabaskan origin, with the latter living on three federal reservations in the state. The Navajo Nation, which spans over 16 million acres (6.5 millionha), mostly in neighboring Arizona, is the largest reservation in the U.S., with one-third of its members living in New Mexico. Pueblo Indians, who share a similar lifestyle but are culturally and linguistically distinct, live in 19 pueblos scattered throughout the state, which collectively span over 2 million acres (800,000 ha). The Puebloans have a long history of independence and autonomy, which has shaped their identity and culture. Many indigenous New Mexicans have moved to urban areas throughout the state, and some cities such as Gallup are major hubs of Native American culture.

Almost half of New Mexicans claim Hispanic origin; many are descendants of colonial settlers called Hispanos or Neomexicanos, who settled mostly in the north of the state between the 16th and 18th centuries; by contrast, the majority of Mexican immigrants reside in the south. Some Hispanos claim Jewish ancestry through descendance from conversos or Crypto-Jews among early Spanish colonists. Many New Mexicans speak a unique dialect known as New Mexican Spanish, which was shaped by the region's historical isolation and various cultural influences; New Mexican Spanish lacks certain vocabulary from other Spanish dialects and uses numerous Native American words for local features, as well as anglicized words that express American concepts and modern inventions.

Architecture

Examples of New Mexico's architectural history date back to the Ancestral Puebloans within Oasisamerica. The Hispanos of New Mexico adapted the Pueblo architecture style within their own buildings, and following the establishment of Albuquerque in 1706, the Territorial Style of architecture blended the styles. Rural communities incorporated both building types into a New Mexico vernacular style, further exemplifying the indigenous roots of New Mexico. After statehood, the modern Pueblo Revival and Territorial Revival architectural styles became more prevalent, with the latter becoming officially encouraged by the state in the 1930s.

Art, Literature, and Media

The earliest New Mexico artists whose work survives today are the Mimbres Indians, whose black and white pottery could be mistaken for modern art, except for the fact that it was produced before 1130 CE. See Mimbres culture. Many examples of this work can be seen at the Deming Luna Mimbres Museum and at the Western New Mexico University Museum.

Santa Fe has long hosted a thriving artistic community, which has included such prominent figures as Bruce Nauman, Richard Tuttle, John Connell and Steina Vasulka. The capital city has several art museums, including the New Mexico Museum of Art, Museum of Spanish Colonial Art, Museum of International Folk Art, Museum of Indian Arts and Culture, Museum of Contemporary Native Arts, SITE Santa Fe and others. Colonies for artists and writers thrive, and the small city teems with art galleries. In August, the city hosts the annual Santa Fe Indian Market, which is the oldest and largest juried Native American art showcase in the world. Performing arts include the renowned Santa Fe Opera, which presents five operas in repertory each July to August; the Santa Fe Chamber Music Festival held each summer; and the restored Lensic Theater, a principal venue for many kinds of performances. The weekend after Labor Day boasts the burning of Zozobra, a fifty-foot (15m) marionette, during Fiestas de Santa Fe.

As New Mexico's largest city, Albuquerque hosts many of the state's leading cultural events and institutions, including the New Mexico Museum of Natural History and Science, the National Hispanic Cultural Center, the National Museum of Nuclear Science & History, and the famed annual Albuquerque International Balloon Fiesta. The National Hispanic Cultural Center has held hundreds of performing arts events, art showcases, and other events related to Spanish culture in New Mexico and worldwide in the centerpiece Roy E Disney Center for the Performing Arts or in other venues at the 53-acre facility. New Mexico residents and visitors alike can enjoy performing art from around the world at Popejoy Hall on the campus of the University of New Mexico. Popejoy Hall hosts singers, dancers, Broadway shows, other types of acts, and Shakespeare. Albuquerque also has the unique and iconic KiMo Theater built in 1927 in the Pueblo Revival Style architecture. The KiMo presents live theater and concerts as well as movies and simulcast operas. In addition to other general interest theaters, Albuquerque also has the African American Performing Arts Center and Exhibit Hall which showcases achievements by people of African descent and the Indian Pueblo Cultural Center which highlights the cultural heritage of the First Nations people of New Mexico.

New Mexico holds strong to its Spanish heritage. Old Spanish traditions such zarzuelas and flamenco are popular;  the University of New Mexico is the only institute of higher education in the world with a program dedicated to flamenco. Flamenco dancer and native New Mexican María Benítez founded the Maria Benítez Institute for Spanish Arts "to present programs of the highest quality of the rich artistic heritage of Spain, as expressed through music, dance, visual arts, and other art forms". There is also the annual Festival Flamenco Internacional de Alburquerque, where native Spanish and New Mexican flamenco dancers perform at the University of New Mexico.

In the mid-20th century, there was a thriving Hispano school of literature and scholarship being produced in both English and Spanish. Among the more notable authors were: Angélico Chávez, Nina Otero-Warren, Fabiola Cabeza de Baca, Aurelio Espinosa, Cleofas Jaramillo, Juan Bautista Rael, and Aurora Lucero-White Lea. As well, writer D. H. Lawrence lived near Taos in the 1920s, at the D. H. Lawrence Ranch, where there is a shrine said to contain his ashes.

New Mexico's strong Spanish, Native American, and Wild West frontier motifs have contributed to a unique body of literature, represented by internationally recognized authors such as Rudolfo Anaya, Tony Hillerman, and N. Scott Momaday. Western fiction folk heroes Billy the Kid, Elfego Baca, Geronimo, and Pat Garrett originate in New Mexico. These same Hispanic, indigenous, and frontier histories have given New Mexico a place in the history of country and Western music, with its own New Mexico music genre, including the careers of Al Hurricane, Robert Mirabal, and Michael Martin Murphey.

Silver City, originally a mining town, is now a major hub and exhibition center for large numbers of artists, visual and otherwise. Another former mining town turned art haven is Madrid, New Mexico, which was brought to national fame as the filming location for the 2007 movie Wild Hogs. Las Cruces, in southern New Mexico, has a museum system affiliated with the Smithsonian Institution Affiliations Program, and hosts a variety of cultural and artistic opportunities for residents and visitors.

The Western genre immortalized the varied mountainous, riparian, and desert environment into film. Owing to a combination of financial incentives, low cost, and geographic diversity, New Mexico has long been a popular setting or filming location for various films and television series. In addition to Wild Hogs, other movies filmed in New Mexico include Sunshine Cleaning and Vampires. Various seasons of the A&E/Netflix series Longmire were filmed in several New Mexico locations, including Las Vegas, Santa Fe, Eagle Nest, and Red River. The widely acclaimed Breaking Bad franchise was set and filmed in and around Albuquerque, a product of the ongoing success of media in the city in large part helped by Albuquerque Studios, and the presence of production studios like Netflix and NBCUniversal.

Cuisine 

New Mexico is known for its unique and eclectic culinary scene, which fuses various indigenous cuisines with those of Spanish and Mexican Hispanos originating in Nuevo México. Like other aspects of the state's culture, New Mexican cuisine has been shaped by a variety of influences from throughout its history; consequently, it is unlike Latin food originating elsewhere in the contiguous United States. Distinguishing characteristics include the use of local spices, herbs, flavors, and vegetables, particularly red and green New Mexico chile peppers, anise (used in bizcochitos), and piñon (pine nuts).

Among the dishes unique to New Mexico are frybread-style sopapillas, breakfast burritos, enchilada montada (stacked enchiladas), green chile stew, carne seca (a thinly sliced variant of jerky), green chile burgers, posole (a hominy dish), slow-cooked frijoles (beans, typically pinto beans), calabacitas (sautéed zucchini and summer squash), and carne adovada (pork marinated in red chile). The state is also the epicenter of a burgeoning Native American culinary movement, in which chefs of indigenous descent serve traditional cuisine through food trucks.

Sports

No major league professional sports teams are based in New Mexico, but the Albuquerque Isotopes are the Pacific Coast League baseball affiliate of the MLB Colorado Rockies. The state hosts several baseball teams of the Pecos League: the Roswell Invaders, Ruidoso Osos, Santa Fe Fuego and the White Sands Pupfish. The Duke City Gladiators of the Indoor Football League (IFL) plays their home games at Tingley Coliseum in Albuquerque; the city also hosts two soccer teams: New Mexico United, which began playing in the second tier USL Championship in 2019, and the associated New Mexico United U23, which plays in the fourth tier USL League Two.

Collegiate athletics are the center of spectator sports in New Mexico, namely the rivalry between various teams of the University of New Mexico Lobos and the New Mexico State Aggies. The intense competition between the two teams is often referred to as the "Rio Grande Rivalry" or the "Battle of I-25" (in reference to both campuses being located along that highway). NMSU also has a rivalry with the University of Texas at El Paso called "The Battle of I-10". The winner of the NMSU-UTEP football game receives the Silver Spade trophy.

Olympic gold medalist Tom Jager, an advocate of controversial high-altitude training for swimming, has conducted training camps in Albuquerque at 5,312 feet (1,619m) and Los Alamos at 7,320 feet (2,231m).

New Mexico is a major hub for various shooting sports, mainly concentrated in the NRA Whittington Center in Raton, which is largest and most comprehensive competitive shooting range and training facility in the U.S.

Historic heritage 
Owing to its millennia of habitation and over two centuries of Spanish colonial rule, New Mexico features a significant number of sites with historical and cultural significance. Forty-six locations across the state are listed by the U.S. National Register of Historic Places, the 18th highest of any state.

New Mexico has nine of the country's 84 national monuments, which are sites federally protected by presidential proclamation; this is the second-highest number after Arizona. The monuments include some of the earliest to have been created: El Morro and Gila Cliff Dwellings, proclaimed in 1906 and 1907, respectively; both preserve the state's ancient indigenous heritage.

New Mexico is one of 20 states with a UNESCO World Heritage Site, and among only eight with more than one. Excluding sites shared between states, New Mexico has the most World Heritage Sites in the country, with three exclusively within its territory.

See also

 Climate change in New Mexico
 Economy of New Mexico
 Geology of New Mexico
 Government of New Mexico
 Governor of New Mexico
 List of counties in New Mexico
 List of municipalities in New Mexico
 History of New Mexico
 Timeline of New Mexico history
 Index of New Mexico-related articles
 List of mountain peaks of New Mexico
 List of rivers of New Mexico
 Outline of New Mexico
 Paleontology in New Mexico

Notes

References

Further reading

 Beck, Warren and Haase, Ynez. Historical Atlas of New Mexico 1969.
 
 Carleton, William, R. "Fruit, Fiber and Fire: A history of Modern Agriculture in New Mexico. Lincoln, University of Nebraska, 2021, 
 Chavez, Thomas E. An Illustrated History of New Mexico, 267 pages, University of New Mexico Press 2002, 
 Bullis, Don. New Mexico: A Biographical Dictionary, 1540–1980, 2 vol, (Los Ranchos de Albuquerque: Rio Grande, 2008) 393 pp. 
 Gonzales-Berry, Erlinda, David R. Maciel, eds. The Contested Homeland: A Chicano History of New Mexico, University of New Mexico Press 2000, 314 pp.
Gutiérrez, Ramón A. "New Mexico's Spanish Catholic Past." American Catholic Studies 133, no. 4 (2022): 61–68.
 Gutiérrez, Ramón A. When Jesus Came, the Corn Mothers Went Away: Marriage, Sexuality, and Power in New Mexico, 1500–1846 (1991)
 Hain, Paul L., F. Chris Garcia, Gilbert K. St. Clair; New Mexico Government 3rd ed. (1994)
 Horgan, Paul, Great River, The Rio Grande in North American History, 1038 pages, Wesleyan University Press 1991, 4th Reprint, Pulitzer Prize 1955
 Larson, Robert W. New Mexico's Quest for Statehood, 1846–1912 (1968)
 Nieto-Phillips, John M. The Language of Blood: The Making of Spanish-American Identity in New Mexico, 1880s–1930s, University of New Mexico Press 2004, 
 Simmons, Marc. New Mexico: An Interpretive History, University of New Mexico Press 1988, 221 pp, good introduction
 Szasz, Ferenc M., and Richard W. Etulain, eds. Religion in Modern New Mexico (1997)
 Trujillo, Michael L. Land of Disenchantment: Latina/o Identities and Transformations in Northern New Mexico (2010) 265 pp; an experimental ethnography that contrasts life in the Espanola Valley with the state's commercial image as the "land of enchantment".
 Weber; David J. Foreigners in Their Native Land: Historical Roots of the Mexican Americans (1973), primary sources to 1912

Primary sources

 Ellis, Richard, ed. New Mexico Past and Present: A Historical Reader. 1971. primary sources
 Tony Hillerman, The Great Taos Bank Robbery and other Indian Country Affairs, University of New Mexico Press, Albuquerque, 1973, trade paperback, 147 pages,, fiction

External links

State government
 New Mexico Government
 New Mexico State Databases: annotated list of searchable databases produced by New Mexico state agencies and compiled by the Government Documents Roundtable of the American Library Association
 Bureau of Business and Economic Research (BBER) at the University of New Mexico: credible and objective data and research to inform economic development and public policy

Federal government
 New Mexico State Guide from the Library of Congress
 Energy Profile for New Mexico: economic, environmental, and energy data
 New Mexico Science In Your Backyard, from the U.S. Geological Society
 "American Southwest" Discover Our Shared Heritage: travel itinerary from the National Park Service
 New Mexico state facts economic research service, U.S. Department of Agriculture

Tourism
 Flora of the Gila National Forest in New Mexico
 

 
Former Spanish colonies
Southwestern United States
States and territories established in 1912
States of the United States
1912 establishments in New Mexico
Contiguous United States